Paolo Catalano (born 27 February 1964 in Tripoli) is a retired Italian sprinter who specialized in the 200 metres, that won two medals with the national relay team at the International athletics competitions.

Biography
He finished seventh in 4 × 100 m relay at the 1987 World Championships, with teammates Ezio Madonia, Domenico Gorla and Pierfrancesco Pavoni. He also competed at the World Indoor Championships in 1989 and 1991 without reaching the final.

His personal best 200 metres time was 20.99 seconds, achieved in February 1989 in Turin. His personal best 100 metres time was 10.61 seconds, achieved in August 1990 in Sestriere.

Achievements

See also
 Italy national relay team

References

External links
 

1964 births
Living people
People from Tripoli, Libya
Italian male sprinters
Mediterranean Games gold medalists for Italy
Athletes (track and field) at the 1987 Mediterranean Games
World Athletics Championships athletes for Italy
Libyan people of Italian descent
Mediterranean Games medalists in athletics